Econyl regenerated nylon is a product introduced in 2011 by Aquafil. It is made entirely from ocean and landfill waste, such as industrial plastic, fabric scraps from clothing manufacturing companies, old carpets and "ghost nets" (lost or abandoned fishing nets).  The product has been used by Stella McCartney (handbag linings, backpacks, outerware, etc.), Kelly Slater's label Outerknown, Adidas and Speedo swimwear, Levi's, Breitling (watch straps), Cantik Swimwear, Rapanui and Panarea Couture swimwear.

Aquafil began nylon recycling in the 1990s, but did not begin exploration of a comprehensive nylon reuse cycle until 2007, which ultimately led to the development of Econyl and the associated closed-loop process in 2011.

Reusing nylon to make Econyl reduces the global warming impact of nylon by 80% compared with the material produced from oil.  Further, the material can be continuously recycled without loss of quality in the finished product.

Aquafil facilities for the collection and recycling of nylon materials include two carpet recycling plants in the United States (in Phoenix, Arizona and Sacramento, California) and a net and carpet recycling facility in Slovenia.  Recycling involves breaking down the nylon polymer into monomers, then re-polymerizing the nylon; the breakdown process is done with only temperature and steam, without the use of chemical agents, in a renewable energy driven process.

References

Further reading

External links

Synthetic fibers